Ribonuclease H2 subunit A, also known as RNase H2 subunit A, is an enzyme that in humans is encoded by the RNASEH2A gene.

Function 

The protein encoded by this gene is a component of the heterotrimeric type II ribonuclease H enzyme (RNaseH2). The other two subunits are the non-catalytic RNASEH2B and RNASEH2C. RNaseH2 is the major source of ribonuclease H activity in mammalian cells and endonucleolytically cleaves ribonucleotides. It is predicted to remove Okazaki fragment RNA primers during lagging strand DNA synthesis and to excise single ribonucleotides from DNA-DNA duplexes.

Clinical significance 

Mutations in this gene cause Aicardi–Goutières syndrome (AGS), an autosomal recessive neurological disorder characterized by progressive microcephaly and psychomotor retardation, intracranial calcifications, elevated levels of interferon-alpha and white blood cells in the cerebrospinal fluid.

References

Further reading

External links
  GeneReviews/NCBI/NIH/UW entry on Aicardi-Goutières Syndrome
  OMIM entries on Aicardi-Goutieres syndrome